"Letter Full of Tears" is a song written by American singer-songwriter Don Covay and released by Gladys Knight & the Pips as a single in November 1961. It became their second top-20 hit, peaking at number 19 on the Billboard Hot 100. The song was covered the following year by English singer Billy Fury who had a minor hit with it.

Background
After the top-ten success of "Every Beat of My Heart" earlier in 1961, subsequent releases of a re-recording of "Every Beat of My Heart" and a cover of the Jesse Belvin song "Guess Who" had failed to continue the group's success. They then asked songwriter Don Covay, who had written Chubby Checker's number one hit "Pony Time", to write a song for them. The resulting song, "Letter Full of Tears", was then arranged by Horace Ott. Bubba Knight has said it "was the first time we had ever used a string section". However, producer Bobby Robinson "didn't really want to record strings, and Marshall Sehorn begged him to put strings on this song for us. Because during this time, when you used strings, it kind of made yourself a bit more sophisticated than the regular R&B thing".

Track listing
7": Fury / 1054
 "Letter Full of Tears" – 2:45
 "You Broke Your Promise" – 2:45

Charts

Billy Fury version

Release
"Letter Full of Tears" was a departure for Fury from his previous rock and roll and pop ballad releases. It was his first R&B single, though he had been singing R&B songs on stage for a while. It was recorded in November 1961, soon after the release of Gladys Knight & the Pips' version, and released in February 1962. It was released with the B-side "Magic Eyes", written by Americans Dorian Burton and Herb Bernstein.

"Letter Full of Tears" was not particularly successful, especially given that Fury's previous three singles had all been top-five. However, Fury later said that "I had an awful lot of trouble with this song. I didn't want to do it because it wasn't my style and I find the vocal really difficult to do and I was really pressurised into doing it. And I didn't like the arrangement". Whilst on the official Record Retailer chart, the single only peaked at number 32, it did fare better on other music paper charts, such as Disc and New Musical Express, both on which the single peaked at number 17.

Track listing
7": Decca / F 11437
 "I'm Lost Without You" – 2:28
 "Magic Eyes" – 2:12

Charts

Other versions
 In 1974, Millie Jackson covered the song on her album I Got to Try It One Time.
 In 1981, Little Milton covered the song on his album Walkin' the Back Streets.
 In 1982, Randy Crawford covered the song on her album Windsong.
 In 1993, Arlene Smith (former lead singer of the Chantels) and Johnny Colla (guitarist for Huey Lewis and the News) covered the song on the tribute album Celebrating the Music of Don Covay – Back to the Streets.
 In 2012, an previously unreleased recording by Esquerita from 1966 was included on the album Sinner Man – The Lost Session.

References

1961 singles
1962 songs
Songs written by Don Covay
Fury Records singles
Decca Records singles
Gladys Knight & the Pips songs
Billy Fury songs
Millie Jackson songs
Randy Crawford songs
Song recordings produced by Mike Smith (British record producer)